Alipta is a genus of  very small sea snails, marine gastropod molluscs in the family Cerithiopsidae.

Species
Species in the genus Alipta include:
 Alipta crenistria (Suter, 1907)

References
 Powell A. W. B., New Zealand Mollusca, William Collins Publishers Ltd, Auckland, New Zealand 1979 

Cerithiopsidae
Taxa named by Harold John Finlay